This list of Canadian disasters by death toll includes major disasters (excluding acts of war) that occurred on Canadian soil or involved Canadian citizens, in a definable incident, where the loss of life was 10 or more.

200 or more deaths

100 to 199 deaths

10 to 99 deaths

 99 – St-Hilaire train disaster, Richelieu River, Beloeil, Quebec, June 29, 1864 [deadliest train disaster in Canada]
 99 – Knights of Columbus Hostel fire, St John's, Newfoundland, December 12, 1942
 84 – Ocean Ranger oil platform sinking, Grand Banks, February 15, 1982
 81 [Canadian fatalities only] – Hurricane Hazel, Toronto, October 1954
 78 – SS Newfoundland seal hunt disaster, Newfoundland, March 1914
 77 – Laurier Palace Theatre fire, Montreal, January 9, 1927
 76 – Quebec Bridge first collapse, August 29, 1907
 74 – Third Springhill mining disaster, Springhill, Nova Scotia, October 23, 1958
 74 – The 2018 North American heat wave resulted in 74 deaths in Quebec
 73–200 – Great Porcupine Fire, Porcupine, Ontario, July 10, 1911
 70 – Desjardins Canal disaster, railway bridge collapse, March 12, 1857
 70 – Frank Slide, Turtle Mountain (Alberta), April 29, 1903
 64 – Canadian Pacific Airlines Flight 402 (CP402) McDonnell Douglas DC-8-43 crashed on landing, Tokyo, Japan March 4, 1966
 63 [Canadian fatalities only] – Ukraine International Airlines Flight 752, January 8, 2020 [fatalities may exclude some holders of Iranian passports ]
 62 – Rogers Pass avalanche, Rogers Pass, British Columbia, March 4, 1910
 62 – Trans-Canada Air Lines Flight 810, Chilliwack, British Columbia, December 9, 1956
 59 – Despatch shipwreck, Isle aux Morts, Newfoundland, July 12, 1828
 55 – Point Ellice Bridge disaster, Victoria, British Columbia, May 26, 1896
 55-58 – 1926 Nova Scotia hurricane, August 8, 1926 [approximate figure, most deaths occurred at sea]
54 – 2018 Eastern Canada heat wave
 52 – Great Western Railway passenger train collides with the tail end of gravel train at Baptiste Creek, Canada West. October 27, 1854
 52-232 – 1900 Galveston hurricane, September 12–14, 1900 [approximate figure, most deaths occurred at sea]
 52 – Canadian Pacific Airlines Flight 21 Douglas DC-6B crashed near Dog Creek, British Columbia when a bomb blew its tail section away, July 8, 1965
 48 – Opémiska Community Hall fire, Chapais, Quebec, December 31, 1979
 47 – Lac-Mégantic rail disaster, Lac-Mégantic, Quebec, July 6, 2013
 44 – Spanish River derailment, Northern Ontario, January 21, 1910
 44 – US Military DC-4 crash, 42 US military personnel and 2 civilians, presumably somewhere in Yukon or British Columbia, January 26, 1950
 44 – 1997 Les Éboulements bus accident, Quebec, October 13, 1997
 43 – Great Fire of 1922, Timiskaming District, Ontario, October 4–5, 1922
 43 – SARS outbreak, Toronto, Ontario, February–September 2003 (out of 251 total cases)
 42 – Pacific Western Airlines Flight 314, Cranbrook/Canadian Rockies International Airport, February 11, 1978
 40+ – HMS Penelope, April 30, 1815, near Cap des Rosiers (many survivors later froze to death)
 40 – Quebec rockslide, Cap Diamant, September 19, 1889
 40 – SS Islander (Canadian Pacific Steam Navigation Company), sunk by iceberg, Lynn Canal south of Juneau, Alaska, August 15, 1901
 40 [Canadian fatalities only] – Titanic, sank April 15, 1912 (Canadian deaths only of 1,517 total)
 40 – Eastman bus accident, Eastman, Quebec, August 4, 1978
 39 – Hollinger Mining Disaster, Timmins, Ontario, February 10, 1928
 39 – Almonte train wreck, December 27, 1942
 39 – Second Springhill mining disaster, Springhill, Nova Scotia, November 1, 1956
 37 – Great Labrador Gale of 1867, October 9, 1867
 37+ – 1869 Saxby Gale, Nova Scotia, New Brunswick, Prince Edward Island, October 4–5, 1869 [most deaths occurred at sea]
 37 – Canadian Pacific Airlines Douglas C-54 A-10-DC disappeared en route without trace out of Vancouver, British Columbia for Anchorage, Alaska, July 21, 1951
 37 – Blue Bird Café fire, Montreal, September 1, 1972
 35 – 1959 Escuminac hurricane, Gulf of St. Lawrence, June 19, 1959
 32 – L'Isle-Verte nursing home fire, L'Isle-Verte, Quebec, January 23, 2014
 31 – Halifax Poor House Fire, November 7, 1882
 31 – Dugald train disaster, Dugald, Manitoba, September 1, 1947
 31 – Saint-Jean-Vianney, Quebec mudslide, May 4, 1971
 30 – John B. King explosion, near Brockville, Ontario, June 26, 1930, lightning struck a drill boat containing dynamite
 30 [est.] – Quebec blizzard, March 3–5, 1971 (conservative estimate, all in Quebec)
 29 – 1929 Grand Banks earthquake and tsunami, Burin Peninsula, November 18, 1929
 29 – SS Edmund Fitzgerald, Lake Superior November 10, 1975, went down with all hands
 28 – Regina Cyclone, Regina, Saskatchewan, June 30, 1912
 28 – LaSalle Heights Disaster, LaSalle, Quebec, March 1, 1965
 28 [Canadian fatalities only] – North American ice storm of 1998, January 1998
 27 – SS Viking, explosion, Horse Islands, Newfoundland and Labrador, March 15, 1931
 27 – Ironworkers Memorial Second Narrows Crossing bridge collapse, Vancouver, June 17, 1958
 27 – Canadian Pacific Air Lines Flight 301 Bristol Britannia crashed in Honolulu, Hawaii, July 22, 1962
 27 – Edmonton tornado, Edmonton, Alberta, July 31, 1987
 26+ – HMS Speedy shipwreck in snowstorm, Lake Ontario, October 8, 1804
 26-28 – Granduc Mine avalanche, Stewart, British Columbia, February 18, 1965 (some references say 28 were killed)
 26 – Westray Mine methane explosion, Plymouth, Nova Scotia, May 9, 1992
 24 – Air Ontario Flight 1363, near Dryden, Ontario, March 10, 1989
 24 – 9/11, September 11, 2001 [Canada fatalities only]
 23 – Québec Airways DC-3 bomb sabotage, Saint-Joachim, Quebec, September 9, 1949 See Albert Guay
 23 – Air Canada Flight 797, aircraft fire, Cincinnati/Northern Kentucky International Airport, June 2, 1983
 23 – Hinton train collision, Hinton, Alberta, February 8, 1986
 23 – Legionnaire's disease outbreak, Toronto, 2005
 23 – 2020 Nova Scotia attacks, Nova Scotia, April 18–19, 2020
 22 – Bus crash Swift Current, Saskatchewan, May 28, 1980
 22 – 2008 Canada listeriosis outbreak, 2008 (out of 57 total cases)
 21 – Canoe River train crash, Valemount, British Columbia, November 21, 1950
 21 – MV Flare bulk carrier shipwreck, Cabot Strait, January 16, 1998
 20 – Beauval Indian Residential School fire, Beauval, Saskatchewan, September 20, 1927
 19 – Dorion level crossing accident, Dorion, Quebec, October 7, 1966
 18 – Ethiopian Airlines Flight 302, March 10, 2019 [Canadian victims only]
 17 – School bus train collision, Lamont, Alberta, November 29, 1960
 17 – Windsor–Tecumseh tornado, Windsor, Ontario June 17, 1946
 17 – Cougar Helicopters Flight 91, off Newfoundland, March 12, 2009
 16 – Protection Island mining disaster, September 10, 1918: elevator cable break
 16 – Humboldt Broncos bus crash, April 6, 2018
 15 – Ottawa & New York Railway Bridge (south channel crossing) bridge collapse, Cornwall, Ontario, September 6, 1898
 15 – Orleans air disaster, Orleans, Ontario, May 15, 1956
 15 – Canadian Pacific Airlines Flight 307 Douglas DC-6B aircrash, near Cold Bay, Alaska, August 29, 1956
 15 – 2004 Indian Ocean earthquake and tsunami [Canadian victims only]
15 – Les Éboulements bus accident, Quebec, June 1, 1974
 14 – "Barrie" tornado outbreak, May 31, 1985
 14 – École Polytechnique massacre, shooting rampage, December 6, 1989
 13 – Sand Point, Ontario, head-on train collision, February 9, 1904
 13 – Quebec Bridge second collapse, September 11, 1913
 13 – MS Arctic Explorer shipwreck, off St Anthony, Newfoundland, July 3, 1981
12 - Boating tragedy Lake of Two Mountains, L'Île-Bizard, Quebec. Twelve NCC (Negro Community Centre) children drown, July 13 1954.
 12 – M.F.V. Enterprise and MV Patrick Morris sinking (the latter was responding to a mayday call from the former), northeast of Cape Breton Island, April 20, 1970
12 – Cormier-Village Hayride Accident, Cormier-Village, New Brunswick, Oct 1989
 12 – Pine Lake tornado in Alberta, July 14, 2000
 12 – First Air Flight 6560 a Boeing 737 crashes near Resolute Bay, Nunavut, August 20, 2011
 11 – Canadian Pacific Airlines De Havilland DH-106 Comet 1A CF-CUN "Empress of Hawaii", crashed on takeoff from Karachi, Pakistan, March 3, 1953 (first passenger jetliner involved in a fatal accident)
 11 – Collision between a van and an eighteen-wheeler, between Stratford and Perth, Ontario, February 6, 2012. (ten of the killed were Peruvian migrant workers)
 10 – Metropolitan Store explosion, Windsor, Ontario, October 25, 1960
 10 – Rupert Hotel Fire, Toronto, December 23, 1989
 10 – Toronto van attack, Toronto, April 23, 2018
 10 – 2022 Saskatchewan stabbings, Saskatchewan, September 4, 2022

See also
 Index of Canada-related articles
 List of disasters in Antarctica by death toll
 List of disasters in Australia by death toll
 List of disasters in Canada (by date)
 List of disasters in Croatia by death toll
 List of disasters in Great Britain and Ireland by death toll
 List of disasters in New Zealand by death toll
 List of disasters in Poland by death toll
 List of disasters in the United States by death toll
 List of anthropogenic disasters by death toll (worldwide)
 Volcanism of Canada

References

External links
Canadian Disasters: an historical survey by Robert L. Jones
SOS! Canadian Disasters, a virtual museum exhibition at Library and Archives Canada
 Maritime Museum of the Atlantic: Marine Heritage Database

Canada
 Disasters_in_Canada_by_death_toll
 Disasters_in_Canada_by_death_toll
 Disasters_in_Canada_by_death_toll
 Disasters_in_Canada_by_death_toll
Distaster
Death toll